The Quebec Nordiques were an ice hockey team who played in both the National Hockey League (NHL) and the World Hockey Association (WHA). This is a list of the head coaches they had during their existence. The franchise moved to Denver, Colorado, in 1995, and became the Colorado Avalanche.

Michel Bergeron coached the most games and won the most points all-time with the Nordiques, with 634 games and 616 points. Maurice Filion and Michel Bergeron were the only coaches to have three terms with the Nordiques. Marc Crawford was the only Nordiques coach to win the Jack Adams Award.

Key

WHA coaches

NHL coaches

See also
List of NHL head coaches
Head Coaches of the Colorado Avalanche

Notes
 A running total of the number of coaches of the Nordiques. Thus any coach who has two or more separate terms as head coach is only counted once.
Maurice Filion started the season as Nordiques' coach but resigned six games into the 1980–81 season in favour of Michel Bergeron.

References

 
Quebec
coaches